Tian Zhandong (born 13 April 1983) is a Chinese ski jumper. He competed in the normal hill and large hill events at the 2006 Winter Olympics.

References

1983 births
Living people
Chinese male ski jumpers
Olympic ski jumpers of China
Ski jumpers at the 2011 Asian Winter Games
Ski jumpers at the 2017 Asian Winter Games
People from Tonghua